Jamea-Tul-Hidaya is an Islamic seminary, situated in Jaipur, in the Indian state of Rajasthan. It was established in 1986 by the Islamic scholar Maulana Abdur Rahim Mujaddidi.

History
Jamea Tul Hidaya was established by Maulana Abdur Rahim Mujaddidi in 1986 at Jaipur. It has an in institute called the Al-Hidaya Study Centre where students are trained for various Indian civil service examinations. On 1 August 2021, the Jamea started its Ifta department. At Jamea-Tul-Hidaya, secular subjects such as computer application, electrical engineering, mechanical engineering and several others are taught alongside religious subjects. It has been called a hi-tech madrasa.

The Jamea Tul Hidaya has been called a third type of madrasa, the other two being the Darul Uloom Deoband and the Nadwatul Ulama. Indian madrasas follow these three patterns, each separately led by the Deoband seminary, the Nadwa and the Jamiatul Hidaya.

References

Bibliography

Further reading
 

Islamic universities and colleges in India
1986 establishments in Rajasthan